VAWS (Verlag und Agentur Werner Symanek) is a German neo-nazi record label. They promote neofolk, industrial and bands in related genres, such as Von Thronstahl. Artists such as Feindflug have left the label.

See also
 List of record labels

External links
 Official page

Companies based in North Rhine-Westphalia
German record labels